Bahjat Suleiman (194925 February 2021), also known as Bahjat Sulayman, was a Syrian Ambassador to Jordan and head of the internal branch of the Syrian General Intelligence Directorate (GID), also known as Branch 251, in Syria. He was instrumental in the accession of Syrian President Bashar Al-Assad to the presidency and was considered to be his confidant and mentor, and in his "inner circle."

Early life and education 
Bahjat Suleiman was born in the city of Lattakia, a graduate of the Homs Military Academy, with a BA in military sciences from the 1968/1970 class. He holds a master's degree in command and staff from the Syrian Command and Staff College. He holds a Ph.D. in Political Economy from Romania.

Early experience 
He was a company commander, battalion, regiment, and tank brigade in the Defense Companies, the paramilitary force in Syria that was commanded by Rifaat al-Assad, and then in the Syrian Arab Army. While in the Defense Companies, he participated in the Yom Kippur War against Israel 1973 in the northern sector, and then in the 1982 Lebanon War.

Under Hafez's rule 
Suleiman began his career as a staunch supporter of Rifaat al-Assad, the uncle of current President Bashar al-Assad, however later switched loyalties to the late Hafez al-Assad. In March 1984, during Rifaat al-Assad's attempted coup d'état, Suleiman as chief of the Defense Companies' security apparatus, sent pertinent intelligence regarding the Defense Companies mobilizations in Damascus to Hafez al-Assad, allowing Hafez to dispatch his own troops to Damascus in time to thwart the coup.

In the years leading to Hafez al-Assad's death, Bahjat Suleiman was responsible for marketing Bashar al-Assad as the "hope" for Syria. When Hafez al-Assad died on June 10, 2000, Bahjat Suleiman publicly pledged support for Bashar al-Assad.

Media 
Bahjat Suleiman was the mastermind of the regime's media policies since Assad took power in 1971. His son Majd Suleiman owns United Group (UG), a media conglomerate seen as the media arm of the Assad regime in various Arab countries, with his business partner Muhammad Bashar Kiwan. His younger son Haidara Suleiman is the editor-in-chief of Syrian government-aligned newspaper Baladna, a leading member of the Syrian Electronic Army, and runs Bashar al-Assad's page on Facebook.

Bahjat Suleiman was a leader in the Baath Party and had published many research pieces and publications on former Syrian President Hafez al-Assad and his son, Basil al-Assad. He had his own blog on Facebook, which published his writings, under the name "Swords of Reason with Bahjat Suleiman"

Controversies

Implication in Rafic Hariri assassination 
Bahjat Suleiman was one of several high-ranking Syrian government and military officials named as responsible for the assassination of Rafic Hariri in a draft of the United Nations Mehlis Report that was erroneously released as a Microsoft Word document which preserved changes that had been made in the document since its creation. The official Mehlis Report made no specific mention of anyone in the Syrian government as responsible for the assassination. The Syrian ambassador to Washington, Imad Mustafa, said that the report is "full of political rumors, gossip, and hearsay."

Expulsion from Jordan 
In May 2014 Bahjat Suleiman was expelled from the Hashemite Kingdom of Jordan over "repeated insults" against the kingdom. The Jordanian foreign ministry said it considered Bahjat Suleiman a persona non grata and gave him 24 hours to leave the country. The decision came after Suleiman crashed the Hashemite royal court's Independence Day celebrations, and in response to his "track record of propagandistic social media posts." It said he had made numerous false allegations, accusing Jordan of harbouring Syrian rebels. Syria responded by declaring Jordan's chargé d'affaires in Damascus persona non grata, saying the expulsion of Suleiman was an unjustified move to expel its ambassador.

Death 
Bahjat Suleiman died on 25 February 2021, from COVID-19.

See also 
 Bahjat Suleiman - Arabic Wikipedia

References 

1949 births
2021 deaths
Syrian Alawites
Syrian generals
Ambassadors of Syria to Jordan
People from Latakia
People of the Syrian civil war
Deaths from the COVID-19 pandemic in Syria
Homs Military Academy alumni